Anelletti al forno (baked anelletti) are a type of baked pasta called pasta al forno typical of Palermo and its province but also widespread in the rest of Sicily.

Characteristics 
Anelletti can be found in commercial establishments, restaurants, diners, fryers, bars with delicatessens, but they are also consumed as a family dish especially on holidays because of the long preparation required.

The pasta used to prepare baked pasta dishes are  anelletti (ring-shaped pasta) of about one centimeter and with a thickness similar to bucatini. At the base of this dish is a particular ragout similar to the one from Bologna, which in the Palermo area is almost always made with the addition of peas. Among the many variants of this way of preparation, some of them include the use of ham, hard-boiled egg in the inner stuffing, others use mozzarella cheese, others pecorino cheese. In some gastronomies it can also be found in single portions, locally called "timballetti", which are prepared in aluminum containers having the shape of a truncated cone.

References

Related articles 

 Pasta al forno
 Palermo
 Sicilian Cuisine

Other projects 

  Wikimedia Commons contiene immagini o altri file su Anelletti al forno
Meat dishes
Tomato dishes
Palermitan cuisine
Cuisine of Sicily
Pasta dishes
Italian cuisine